"You Have the Right to Remain Silent" is a song written by Brenda and Cal Sweat, and recorded by American country music group Perfect Stranger.  It was released in February 1995 as the second single and title track from their album You Have the Right to Remain Silent.  The song was their only Top 40 hit on the Billboard Hot Country Singles & Tracks chart, reaching number 4 in August 1995. It was also their only entry on the Billboard Hot 100, peaking at number 61.

Content
The song is a soft, mellow ballad of a man asking a woman to have a dance with him, and says to her that she has “the right to remain silent” as they dance together.

Chart performance
"You Have the Right to Remain Silent" debuted at number 75 on the U.S. Billboard Hot Country Singles & Tracks for the week of April 15, 1995.

Year-end charts

Parodies
American country music parody artist Cledus T. Judd released a parody of "You Have the Right to Remain Silent" titled "You Have No Right to Remain Violent" on his 1996 album I Stoled This Record.

References

1995 singles
1995 songs
Perfect Stranger (band) songs
Curb Records singles